City of Beautiful Nonsense can refer to:

 The City of Beautiful Nonsense (novel), a novel by E. Temple Thurston 
 The City of Beautiful Nonsense (1919 film), a 1919 film based on the novel
 City of Beautiful Nonsense (1935 film), a 1935 film based on the novel